Michael Accorsi Zunino (born March 25, 1991) is an American professional baseball catcher for the Cleveland Guardians of Major League Baseball (MLB). He has previously played in MLB for the Seattle Mariners and Tampa Bay Rays.

Before beginning his professional career, Zunino played college baseball at the University of Florida, where he won the Dick Howser Trophy, Golden Spikes Award, and Johnny Bench Award in his junior year. The Mariners selected Zunino with the third overall pick in the 2012 MLB draft. He made his MLB debut in 2013.

Early life
Born and raised in Cape Coral, Florida, Mike is the son of Greg and Paola Zunino. He is of Italian descent. His parents met in Italy while Greg played professional baseball in Italy for Fortitudo Baseball Bologna and Paola was a catcher for the Italian national softball team. Greg Zunino was drafted in the 31st round of the 1981 MLB June Amateur Draft. Mike's uncle, Gary Zunino, was a catcher in the St. Louis Cardinals system.

Zunino played baseball at Mariner High School in Cape Coral, where he graduated in 2009. He participated in the AFLAC All-American High School Baseball Game at Dodger Stadium in 2008.

College career

The Oakland Athletics selected Zunino in the 29th round of the 2009 MLB Draft, but he did not sign and chose to attend college. Zunino accepted an athletic scholarship to attend the University of Florida in Gainesville, where he played for coach Kevin O'Sullivan's Florida Gators baseball team from 2010 to 2012.  He led the Gators to three consecutive College World Series appearances in 2010, 2011 and 2012.

Zunino was named to the Baseball America All-American team as a sophomore in 2011 and was named Southeastern Conference (SEC) player of the year. He was the second Florida Gator to win the SEC player of the year award after Matt LaPorta did so in 2005 and 2007. In 2011, he played with the Yarmouth–Dennis Red Sox of the Cape Cod Baseball League. In 2012, Zunino won the Golden Spikes Award, Dick Howser Trophy, and the Johnny Bench Award.

Professional career

Draft and minor leagues (2012–2013)
The Seattle Mariners selected Zunino in the first round, with the third overall selection, of the 2012 MLB draft. He signed with the Mariners on July 3, receiving a $4 million signing bonus, and was assigned to the Everett AquaSox of the Class A-Short Season in the Northwest League. Zunino spent six weeks with the Aquasox in 2012, batting .373 with 10 home runs and 35 runs batted in (RBIs). He was promoted to the Jackson Generals of the Class AA Southern League on August 13. In 15 games with Jackson, Zunino batted .333. After the regular season, Zunino played for the Peoria Javelinas of the Arizona Fall League (AFL). He batted .288 in 19 games for Peoria and appeared in the AFL Rising Stars Game.

Zunino opened the 2013 season as a member of the Tacoma Rainiers of the Class AAA Pacific Coast League. He batted .238 with 11 homers and 43 RBIs with 59 strikeouts in 185 at-bats for Tacoma through June 10.

Seattle Mariners (2013–2018)
The Mariners promoted Zunino to the major leagues on June 11, 2013. He made his first major league start the next day and singled in his second at bat, on an 0–2 pitch. On June 14, Zunino hit his first career home run on his third at bat. Against the Chicago Cubs on June 28, Zunino collected the first walk-off hit of his career. On July 25, Zunino broke his hand and was placed on the 15-day DL. He returned in early September, getting the bulk of the starts to end the season. In 52 games with the Mariners, he hit .214/.290/.329 with five home runs and 14 RBIs. Zunino batted .199 in 2014 with 22 home runs, but struck out 158 times and only walked 17 times, with an on-base percentage of .254.

In August 2015, the Mariners demoted Zunino to Tacoma. He was hitting .174 with 132 strikeouts in 112 games played at the time, and remained in Class AAA for the final month of the season. After the signing of Chris Iannetta, Zunino began the 2016 season in AAA. He was called up briefly in late June, but returned to the minor leagues in early July. He finished with a .207 batting average in 55 games with 12 home runs. Zunino established career highs offensively in 2017 in each statistical offensive category. He took a step back in 2018, hitting .201 with 20 home runs and 44 RBIs. On May 8, he caught James Paxton's no-hitter against the Toronto Blue Jays, a 5–0 victory.

Tampa Bay Rays (2019–2022)
On November 8, 2018, the Mariners traded Zunino to the Tampa Bay Rays along with Guillermo Heredia and Michael Plassmeyer, in exchange for Mallex Smith and Jake Fraley. He hit his first home run as a Ray on April 22, 2019, a go-ahead two-run shot against the Kansas City Royals.

On November 25, 2019, Zunino signed a one-year deal to remain with the Rays in 2020. Zunino finished the 2020 season batting .147 with 4 home runs over 28 games. The Rays finished the season with the best record in the American League. Through the American League playoffs, Zunino hit four home runs with eight RBIs. The Rays won every game in which Zunino recorded an RBI, including game 7 of the American League Championship Series against the Houston Astros. The Rays advanced to the World Series against the Los Angeles Dodgers, where they lost in six games.

The Rays declined their $4.5 million team option over his contract for the 2021 season on October 30, 2020, and he became a free agent. On December 16, 2020, Zunino re-signed with the Rays on a one-year contract with a club option for 2022, worth $3 million in guaranteed money. On July 4, Zunino was named to the 2021 All-Star Game as a reserve. He homered against New York Mets pitcher Taijuan Walker in the game, becoming the second Ray with an All-Star Game home run. In 2021 he had the highest slugging percentage against left-handers of all major league players, at 868.

Zunino played in 2022 through June 9, when he experienced thoracic outlet syndrome in his left arm. He underwent surgery to correct it, ending his 2022 season.

Cleveland Guardians
On December 15, 2022, Zunino signed a one-year contract worth $6 million with the Cleveland Guardians.

Personal life
Zunino married his high school sweetheart, Alyssa Barry, in Florida on October 6, 2012. They have a son, born in 2019, and a daughter, born in 2020.

See also
2012 College Baseball All-America Team

References

External links

1991 births
Living people
All-American college baseball players
American League All-Stars
American people of Italian descent
Baseball players from Florida
Everett AquaSox players
Florida Gators baseball players
Jackson Generals (Southern League) players
Major League Baseball catchers
Modesto Nuts players
People from Cape Coral, Florida
Peoria Javelinas players
Seattle Mariners players
Tacoma Rainiers players
Tampa Bay Rays players
Yarmouth–Dennis Red Sox players